Matthew Ebden and Samuel Groth were the defending champions; however, they were defeated 2–6, 6–3, [6–10] by Paolo Lorenzi and Grega Žemlja in the quarterfinals.
Philip Bester and Peter Polansky won the title, defeating Marinko Matosevic and Rubin Jose Statham 6–4, 3–6, [14–12] in the final.

Seeds

Draw

Draw

External links
 Main Draw

McDonald's Burnie International - Doubles
Burnie International
2011 in Australian tennis